Sri Lankan women's cricket team toured New Zealand in November 2015. The tour included a series of 5 ODIs and 3 T20Is. The first 3 of the 5 ODIs matches were also part of the 2014–16 ICC Women's Championship. The Sri Lanka team was announced on 8 October 2015 and the captaincy was given back to all-rounder Shashikala Siriwardene. However, on the third WODI, Siriwardene suffered a thumb fracture injury which forced her to retire from the tour and the captaincy for the remaining matches was given back to the previous captain Chamari Atapattu.

Squads

Tour match

ODI series

1st ODI

2nd ODI

3rd ODI

4th ODI

5th ODI

T20I series

1st T20I

2nd T20I

3rd T20I

References

External links 
 Series home at Cricinfo

International cricket competitions in 2015–16
Women's international cricket tours of New Zealand
2014–16 ICC Women's Championship
November 2015 sports events in Asia
New 
2015 in New Zealand cricket
cricket
2015 in Sri Lankan cricket
2015 in women's cricket